The 1897 college football season had no clear-cut champion, with the Official NCAA Division I Football Records Book listing Penn and Yale as having been selected national champions.

Conference and program changes

Conference establishments
One conference played its final season in 1897:
Western Interstate University Football Association – active since 1892

Membership changes

Conference standings

Major conference standings

Independents

Minor conferences

See also
 1897 College Football All-America Team

References